Roman Nikolayevich Yakovlev (born 13 August 1976) is a former volleyball player born in Ukraine, who played for Russia. He was a member of the Men's National Team that won the silver medal at the 2000 Summer Olympics in Sydney, Australia. Two years later he won the Volleyball World League (2002) with Russia.

Individual awards
 1999 FIVB World Cup "Most Valuable Player"
 1999 FIVB World Cup "Best Spiker"
 2000 Serie A1 League MVP

References

External links
 
 
 

1976 births
Living people
Russian men's volleyball players
Volleyball players at the 2000 Summer Olympics
Olympic volleyball players of Russia
Olympic silver medalists for Russia
Sportspeople from Kharkiv
Place of birth missing (living people)
Olympic medalists in volleyball
Medalists at the 2000 Summer Olympics
VC Belogorie players
Ural Ufa volleyball players